Jana Naretha Anne Stewart (born c. 1987) is an Australian Senator and former public servant. 

She is a member of the Australian Labor Party (ALP).

Early life and education
Stewart is an Aboriginal Australian of the Muthi Muthi and Wamba-Wamba peoples. Her great-grandmother Alice Kelly was a custodian of Lake Mungo in New South Wales and was involved in negotiations over the Lake Mungo remains.

Stewart was born in around 1987 and grew up in Melbourne and Swan Hill, Victoria. She is the oldest of six children and experienced family violence as a child. She attended "at least a dozen" primary schools, and was the only Indigenous student at her high school to finish year 12. She completed a master's degree in clinical family therapy at La Trobe University.

Career
Prior to entering politics, Stewart worked as a family therapist, university lecturer, and policy adviser on Aboriginal affairs and child protection. She worked for Victorian state Aboriginal affairs minister Natalie Hutchins on treaty negotiations. She was a later a deputy secretary of the Victorian Department of Justice focusing on Stolen Generations reparations.

Career prior to Senate 
Stewart is a member of the Labor Unity faction and is associated with the Transport Workers' Union. 

At the 2019 federal election she was preselected for the House of Representatives seat of Kooyong. She placed third, with 17 percent of the vote on a negative swing of four points, behind incumbent federal treasurer Josh Frydenberg and Greens candidate Julian Burnside.

In late 2021, Stewart won ALP preselection for the seat of Pascoe Vale at the 2022 Victorian state election. She withdrew following her nomination to the Senate in March 2022.

Senate career
In March 2022, Stewart was nominated to fill a casual vacancy in the Senate caused by the death of Victorian senator Kimberley Kitching. She also won ALP preselection for the Senate ticket at the 2022 federal election. 

She was officially appointed to the Senate at a joint sitting of the Victorian Parliament on 6 April 2022. However, the Senate did not sit between her appointment and the imminent election.

Jana took her seat after the 2022 federal election. Stewart is the youngest Aboriginal woman to serve in the federal parliament.

Personal life 
Jana is partnered with Marcus Stewart, Co-Chair of the First Peoples' Assembly of Victoria.

She and her partner have two children, Jude and Ari.

References

Australian Labor Party members of the Parliament of Australia
Labor Right politicians
Members of the Australian Senate for Victoria
Indigenous Australian politicians
La Trobe University alumni
Public servants of Victoria (Australia)
Living people
Year of birth missing (living people)
Members of the Australian Senate
People from Swan Hill